John Joseph Slater (1872- 16 May 1926) was an Australian composer of popular and light classical works. He operated a music publishing company in Leichardt and blended his product with sheet music from other sources in Haymarket, Sydney. He wrote under several alias names and is commonly known as Felix Le Roy.
Slater was active in variety theatre, particularly the company of Harry Rickards

His mature works include a series of favourably mentioned  impressions for cornet, violin and piano trio  - Bells of Peace, Spring Morning and Day Dreams. Slater's song A Faded Leaf of Shamrock sold six editions. Slater's more popular variety theatre pieces  enjoyed larger reprints, especially One of these Days ran to a hundred and seventy five editions.

Works
Seventy published titles are preserved in Australian libraries.
 1916 Melody of Peace 
 Spring Morning 
 Day Dreams
 1917 One of these days
 1914 Somebody's calling the cooee call 
 1916 I'd Like to Call You Sweetheart 
 1913 Your eyes are the light of my world

Recordings
 2001 We'd fly the green above us, A bird with a broken wing (Heritage Singers)  
 2013   Why can't each nation be at peace?, Lonely (Wirripang)

References

1872 births
1926 deaths
Australian male composers
Australian composers
20th-century Australian poets
Australian male poets
Composers
20th-century Australian male writers
Australian songwriters
Male jazz musicians